U.S. Coal and Coke Company Store was a historic company store building located at Ream, McDowell County, West Virginia.  It was built about 1910, and was two-story, square-plan brick building. It featured segmental arched windows and simple decoration.

It was listed on the National Register of Historic Places in 1992. It was demolished sometime between March 2004 and 2006.

References

Commercial buildings on the National Register of Historic Places in West Virginia
Energy infrastructure completed in 1910
National Register of Historic Places in McDowell County, West Virginia
Demolished buildings and structures in West Virginia
Company stores in the United States